Reward may refer to:

Places
 Reward (Shelltown, Maryland),  a historic home in Shelltown Maryland
 Reward, California (disambiguation)
 Reward-Tilden's Farm,  a historic home in Chestertown Maryland

Arts, entertainment, and media
 "Reward" (song), a 1981 song by The Teardrop Explodes
 The Reward (opera), an 1815 opera by Karol Kurpiński 
 The Reward, a 1965 American Western film

Business and economics 
Bounty (reward), a reward, often money, which is offered as an incentive
Cashback reward program, an incentive program
Reward website, a website that offers rewards for performing tasks

Science
 Brain stimulation reward, an operant response following electrical stimulation of the brain
 Incentive salience, the form of motivational salience which is associated with rewards
 Reward dependence, a personality trait in psychology
 Reward system, the brain structures and neural pathways that are involved in reward cognition

See also
 Award
 Incentive
 Incentive program
 Loyalty program
 Premium (marketing), e.g., "premiums"

te:రివార్డ్